John Caroll Houston IV (April 3, 1842 – February 22, 1918) was one of the first permanent settlers of Eau Gallie, Florida and served as its mayor for three terms in 1897, 1902, and 1910.

References 

1842 births
1918 deaths
American Civil War prisoners of war
American military personnel of the Indian Wars
American people of Scottish descent
County commissioners in Florida
Florida pioneers
Mayors of Melbourne, Florida
Sea captains
People from Jacksonville, Florida
19th-century American politicians
People from Eau Gallie, Florida